This is a list of Members of Parliament (MPs) elected to the House of Commons of the United Kingdom by Northern Irish constituencies for the 52nd Parliament of the United Kingdom (1997 to 2001). There are 18 such constituencies, thirteen of which were represented by Unionists and five by Nationalists. It includes MPs elected at the 1997 United Kingdom general election, held on 1 May 1997.

The list is sorted by the name of the MP.

Sinn Féin MPs follow an abstentionist policy of not taking their seats in the House of Commons.

Composition

MPs 

 William McCrea was elected in the 2000 South Antrim by-election

References

See also 

 Northern Ireland
1997-2001
MPs
1990s elections in Northern Ireland